Matteo Ciacci (born 5 May 1990) is a Sammarinese politician, who served as one of the Captains Regent, along with Stefano Palmieri. He took office on 1 April 2018 and served until 1 October 2018.

He worked as an official and sports manager. Ciacci studied law at the University of Urbino. In time of his service, he was the youngest serving state leader in the world, being the first to be born after the fall of the Berlin Wall and also the first head of state born in the 1990s.

References

1990 births
People from Borgo Maggiore
Captains Regent of San Marino
Members of the Grand and General Council
Living people
Civic 10 politicians